The  is the prefectural parliament of Kyoto Prefecture.

Overview
Kyoto Prefecture is a stronghold of the Japanese Communist Party, which continued with the revolutionary government of Torazō Ninagawa over the seventh term over 28 years. The two-person district was called the "co-reserved seat" (the Kyoto at-large district was also called that).

In the 2007 Kyoto Prefectural Assembly election, the Democratic candidate defeated the Liberal Democratic Party candidate in the one-person constituency of Ayabe, Kyoto, and made a breakthrough in the second party. For this reason, for a period of time, the composition of Kyoto's own "Community vs. Anti-Community" was becoming "Land vs. Democracy vs. Communism". The Communist Party moved up to the second party with three more seats, such as the first elected winner in Yawata City in the two-member district.

Members

References

Prefectural assemblies of Japan
Politics of Kyoto Prefecture